Liu Guiping (born May 1966) is a Chinese banker and politician who is the current vice president of the People's Bank of China, in office since November 2020. He previously served as president of China Construction Bank and before that, vice mayor of Chongqing.

He is a delegate to the 13th National People's Congress.

Biography
Liu was born in Hengnan County, Hunan, in May 1966. In 1982, he entered Xiangtan University, majoring in political economics. After graduation, he was accepted to Jinan University, graduating with a master's degree in political economics.

Liu joined the Chinese Communist Party (CCP) in May 1986. Beginning in May 1989, he served in several posts in the Agricultural Bank of China, including president of Fujian Branch, president of Shanghai Branch, and head of Retail Banking Business Department.

In May 2014, he became deputy general manager of China Investment Corporation, but having held the position for only two years. In June 2016, he was appointed vice mayor of Chongqing.

He became president of China Construction Bank in May 2019, and served until November 2020, when he was made vice president of the People's Bank of China.

References

1966 births
Living people
People from Hengnan County
Xiangtan University alumni
Jinan University alumni
Chinese bankers
People's Republic of China politicians from Hunan
Chinese Communist Party politicians from Hunan
Delegates to the 13th National People's Congress